Maronite Politics, also translated as Political Maronism, is a form of identity politics used in Lebanon that refers to Sectarian ideals of Maronite politicians, as well as the period where Maronites were the main political actors in negotiations with France for political autonomy.

In 1920, Maronites played a key role in the establishment of Greater Lebanon by the French Mandate. They were the largest sect at the time, and were appointed to the main political offices; the President, the Prime Minister and the Speaker. The National Pact of 1943 dedicated their right to hold the presidency.

Maronites are usually associated with Phoenicianism and Lebanese nationalism, which are ideologies that reject the Arab identity of Lebanon and the Lebanese people, 
claiming that they are descended from Phoenicians, an ancient civilization that lived on the coast of the Eastern Mediterranean.

References 

Political terminology in Lebanon
Maronites